Thomas Andrew Parker (born Andreas Cornelis van Kuijk; June 26, 1909 January 21, 1997), commonly known as Colonel Parker, was a Dutch musical entrepreneur, best known for being Elvis Presley's manager.

Born in the Netherlands, Parker entered the United States illegally when he was 20 years old. He adopted a new name and claimed to have been born in the United States. A carnival worker by background, Parker moved into music promotion in 1938, working with one of the first popular crooners, Gene Austin, and then country music singers Eddy Arnold, Hank Snow, and Tommy Sands. He also assisted Jimmie Davis' campaign to become governor of Louisiana. As a reward, Davis gave him the honorary rank of "colonel" in the Louisiana State Militia.

Parker encountered Presley in 1955, and by 1956 had become his primary representative. With Parker's help, Presley signed a recording contract with RCA Victor, leading to his commercial breakthrough in 1956 with his sixth single "Heartbreak Hotel" and propelling him to become one of the most popular and commercially successful entertainers in the world. Parker was able to receive more than half of the income from the enterprise, an unprecedented figure for a music manager. He negotiated Presley's lucrative merchandising deals and media appearances, as well as influenced his personal life, including Presley's decisions to accept military service in 1958 and to marry Priscilla Beaulieu in 1967. Parker encouraged Presley to make film musicals which became the focus of his career during his commercial decline in the 1960s until his 1968 comeback and return to touring. In later years, Parker's influence waned, but he continued in his management role until Presley's death in 1977.

For the rest of his life, Parker managed the Presley estate. Having previously sold the rights to Presley's early recordings to RCA, he struggled to secure a steady income and his financial situation worsened after he sustained significant gambling losses. Parker's final years were spent living in Las Vegas, in increasingly poor health, before his death in 1997.

Early life
Thomas Andrew Parker was born as Andreas Cornelis van Kuijk on June 26, 1909, in Breda, North Brabant, Netherlands, and was the seventh of eleven children. He was the son of Maria Elisabeth (Ponsie) and Adam van Kuijk. As a boy, Parker worked as a barker at carnivals in his hometown, learning many of the skills that he would use later while working in the entertainment industry.

At age 15, Van Kuijk moved to the port city of Rotterdam, gaining employment on boats. By age 17 he first expressed his desire to run away to the United States to "make his fortune". A year later, following his 18th birthday, Parker entered the U.S. illegally by jumping ship from his employer's vessel. Upon arrival he traveled with a Chautauqua educational tent show

According to biographer Alanna Nash, Parker may have been a suspect or a person of interest in an unsolved murder case in Breda. In early 1929, a 23-year-old newlywed woman, Anna van den Enden, was found beaten to death in the living quarters behind a grocer's store. The premises had been ransacked in search of money. There were no witnesses and almost no evidence, except that the killer spread pepper on and around the body before fleeing in hopes that police dogs would not pick up his scent. The killing happened a few streets from where Parker's family lived, and Parker had been hired to make deliveries from this and other grocery stores in the area. This may have motivated Parker to avoid seeking a passport, as the Netherlands had an active extradition treaty with the U.S., and he may have wanted to avoid criminal arrest by Dutch authorities.

In May 1929, Parker returned to the U.S. and found work with carnivals owing to his previous experience in the Netherlands. He enlisted in the United States Army a few months later, taking the name "Tom Parker" from the name of the officer who interviewed him, to disguise the fact he was an illegal alien. He completed basic training at Fort McPherson in Georgia.

Parker served two years in the 64th Coast Artillery at Fort Shafter, Hawaii, and shortly afterwards re-enlisted at Fort Barrancas, Florida. Although he had served honorably for a time, he went AWOL in Florida and was charged with desertion. He was punished with solitary confinement, from which he emerged with a psychosis that led to him spending two months in a mental hospital. His condition caused him to be discharged from the army.

Following his discharge, Parker worked at a number of jobs, including food concessions and gaming carnivals. Between 1931 and 1938, he worked as a "carny" with Royal American Shows. He began to build up a list of contacts that would prove valuable in later years.

In 1935, Parker married 27-year-old Marie Francis Mott. They struggled to survive during the Great Depression, working short cons and traveling across the country in search of work. Parker later said that at times they had had to live on as little as $1 a week (US$ in  dollars).

Career

Early talent management (1938–1954)
Parker first became involved in the music industry as a promoter in 1938, working with the popular crooner Gene Austin. Despite having sold over 86 million records since 1924 and earning over $17 million, Austin's career was at a low point. Austin had spent much of his fortune on excessive living, and his popularity had been eclipsed by other singers, such as Bing Crosby. Parker found his career transition smooth, using much of his "carny" experience to sell tickets and attract crowds to Austin's concerts. While he was a successful promoter, Parker wanted to move into management.

Austin offered Parker the opportunity to move to Nashville, Tennessee, where music was becoming a big business, but for reasons unknown Parker turned down the offer. Instead he decided to stay with his family in Temple Terrace, Florida, perhaps to avoid having to submit paperwork that could expose his illegal status. Within a year, Parker had the opportunity to become a legal citizen of the United States  a new law allowed illegal aliens the chance to become citizens in return for their promise to fight for the U.S. during World War II, if required. Parker served in the peacetime army as a precondition for taking advantage of that stipulation, but he never subsequently applied to become a citizen. He decided against registering, possibly to prevent his previous army record from becoming public.

Parker found employment as a field agent with a local animal shelter, the Hillsborough County Humane Society. The job not only offered him a secure wage, it also offered a rent-free apartment above the Humane Society in a remote part of West Tampa for him and his family. With the Society in need of funds, Parker set about using his promotional experience to raise money and awareness for the shelter.

Through the fundraising, Parker headed to Tennessee to find acts to perform at his charity events, among them stars such as Minnie Pearl and Eddy Arnold. Eventually, he began getting more involved in music promotion again, this time for himself rather than the Society. In 1945, Parker became Arnold's full-time manager, signing a contract for 25% of his earnings. Over the next few years, he helped Arnold secure hit songs, television appearances, and live tours.

In 1948, Parker received the honorary rank of colonel in the Louisiana State Militia from Jimmie Davis, the governor of Louisiana and a former country singer, in gratitude for Parker's work on Davis's election campaign. The rank was honorary, since Louisiana had no organized militia, but Parker used the title throughout his life, becoming known simply as "the Colonel" to many acquaintances.

A young singer, Tommy Sands, caught Parker's eye in 1952, and Parker immediately set about promoting him. He arranged live appearances and became something of a father figure to the then-15-year-old Sands. Parker had intended to mold Sands into the next Roy Rogers, but Sands had no interest in such a plan. Instead, Parker sent demonstration recordings to record producer Steve Sholes at RCA Victor. Sholes showed little interest in Sands, but promised that he would attempt to find songs Sands might be able to record.

Eddy Arnold fired Parker in 1953 over Parker's growing involvement with the singer Hank Snow. However, Parker remained involved in many of Arnold's live tours and demanded a buyout of $50,000 (US$ in  dollars) to settle their contract. Parker and Snow eventually formed Hank Snow Enterprises and Jamboree Attractions, a successful promotional outfit for up-and-coming country singers.

Meeting Elvis Presley
In early 1955, Parker became aware of a young singer, Elvis Presley. Presley had a singing style different from the current trend, and Parker was immediately interested in the future of this musical style. At that time Parker believed Elvis to be black. Presley's first manager was Scotty Moore, the guitarist in his band, who was encouraged by Sun Records owner Sam Phillips to become Presley's manager to protect Elvis from unscrupulous music promoters. In the beginning, Presley, Moore, and the bassist Bill Black were a trio, the Blue Moon Boys. However, when Presley signed a recording contract with Phillips, Moore and Black were excluded. Phillips told them to make a separate deal with Elvis. According to Moore, Presley agreed to take 50 percent, with Moore and Black splitting the other 50 percent. A one-year management contract with Presley provided Moore with a 10-percent commission, which Moore said he never took. The contract, dated July 12, 1954, eight days after their first recording session, was signed by Presley and his parents. When the contract expired, the Memphis radio personality Bob Neal stepped in and made a deal with Phillips to become Presley's manager. At that point, Moore and Black had no contractual ties to either Phillips or Presley. Neal was struggling at the time to accommodate his new client's success, and in February 1955, following a meeting with Parker, Presley agreed to let Parker take some control of future bookings and promotions.

Parker and Neal worked together to promote Presley, using their own Hank Snow Tour to book him and tour him. Although Neal remained Presley's official manager, Parker was becoming increasingly involved in the running of his career, and by the summer of 1955 he had become Presley's "special advisor". As Presley was still a minor, his parents had to sign the contract with Parker on his behalf. Part of Parker's role was to secure a new recording contract with a bigger label. Presley had been at Sun Records since the beginning of his career, but Sam Phillips, the owner of Presley's current label, was aware that to have any kind of a successful future Presley would need the backing of a much larger label. Despite this, Phillips was not keen to let him go easily, advising Parker that he would require $40,000 (US$ in  dollars) to secure the release of Presley's contract, a completely unheard-of sum at the time.

Parker immediately went to work to find a new label for Presley. Both Mercury Records and Columbia Records showed interest, although their initial offers were nowhere near the $40,000 requirement. RCA Victor, Hank Snow's current label, also showed an interest, but they were put off by the cost of the contract. However, RCA Victor producer Steve Sholes was convinced that Presley's style of music would be a huge hit with the right label, and he began talks with Parker. RCA made it clear it were unwilling to go above $25,000 for a practically unknown singer, but Parker persuaded them that Presley was no ordinary unknown singer. Around the same time, realizing the deal for Presley might fall through due to the cost of the contract, Parker attempted to sell Tommy Sands to RCA. He suggested to Sholes that Sands could record material similar to Presley's style. Remembering his previous experience with Sands, Sholes dismissed Sands as a viable replacement for Presley.

In November, Parker and Snow persuaded RCA to buy Presley out from Sun for $40,000, and on November 21, Presley's contract was officially transferred from Sun Records to RCA Victor. Snow attended the signing, thinking that Elvis had signed a management contract with Jamboree Attractions, which he owned with Parker. However, that was not the case since Elvis was still under contract to Bob Neal. The document that was signed on November 21 pertained to the record label transfer. In return for a larger financial stake in the deal, Neal agreed not to renew his management contract with Presley after it expired in March 1956, allowing Parker the opportunity to claim the job for himself.

Signing Elvis (1956–1957) 
On March 26, 1956, after Presley's management contract with Neal expired, Presley signed a contract with Parker that made him his exclusive representative. Later, when Hank Snow asked Parker about the status of their contract with Presley, Parker told him: "You don't have any contract with Elvis Presley. Elvis is signed exclusively to the Colonel."

With his first RCA Victor single, "Heartbreak Hotel", in 1956, Presley became a recording star. Parker began 1956 intending to bring his new star to the national stage. He arranged for Presley to appear on popular television shows, such as The Milton Berle Show and The Ed Sullivan Show, securing fees that made Presley the highest-paid star on television. By the summer Presley had become one of the most famous new faces of the year, causing excitement among the new teenage audience and outrage among some older audiences and religious groups. Presley said of Parker: "I don't think I would have ever been very big if it wasn't for him. He's a very smart man."

Parker signed a deal with Beverly Hills film merchandiser Hank Saperstein for nearly $40,000 to turn Presley into a brand name. With over 78 different possibilities, from charm bracelets to record players, Presley merchandise brought in $22 million by the end of 1956. Parker, with his 25% share of profits, found ways to make money from his artist that other managers before him had never thought of. He had even come up with the idea to market "I Hate Elvis" badges.

In April 1956, Parker made his first mistake with Presley's career. He had booked Presley into a four-week Las Vegas engagement, misjudging the reaction of the slightly older, more reserved audiences that Las Vegas attracted. While Presley was a hit among the youth of America, the middle-aged audiences found him an oddity. Some viewed him as a clown-like figure, wiggling his hips for screams, while others found him vulgar and more suitable for late-night gentleman's clubs. After a cold reception during his first few shows, Parker cut Presley's appearance to two weeks. Presley remembered the event as one of the worst moments of his career.

Despite this setback, Presley was still going from strength to strength. He had expressed interest in making films when he first met Parker, and now Parker was working to make that happen. He arranged for a screen test with Paramount Pictures, and after impressing them with Presley's acting ability, Presley was signed to a seven-picture contract. Parker made sure that the contract allowed Presley the freedom to make at least one film a year with another studio, and also managed to set up an office, with staff, at Paramount. Presley's acting career was originally intended to be a serious one, but after seeing a chance to cross-promote singles and albums with the films, Parker persuaded Presley to sing in his films. This proved very lucrative, especially when the single for Presley's first film, Love Me Tender, sold over one million copies in advance sales. With 1956 coming to a close, Parker had made Presley one of the most well-known, well-paid entertainers in the world.

In 1957, Parker finally managed to give Tommy Sands his big break by arranging for him to audition for and star in The Singin' Idol, a drama for NBC that was loosely based on the life and career of Presley. NBC had originally wanted Presley for the role, but Parker had turned them down. In the drama, the role of Sands was portrayed as a "twisted psychopath". Critics were very positive in their reviews of both the drama and Sands, leading to Capitol Records signing Sands within a week. Soon after, Sands' song "Teen-Age Crush" reached number 2 on the pop charts, eventually selling 800,000 copies.

Elvis in the Army (1958–1960) 
Regardless of the success that Parker and Presley had achieved, Parker was still struggling to believe that Presley's career would last longer than a year or two. Parker had seen many acts come and go during his earlier years in management and felt that it would be foolish to believe that Presley, despite being Parker's most successful act to date, would be any different. In January 1958 Presley received his draft notice from the United States Army. Presley was upset about the potential negative effect accepting the draft would have on his career, but Parker was secretly overjoyed.

Presley had been showing signs of rebellion against Parker, and Parker believed that a stint in the Army would cure him of this.
Parker was looking ahead when he persuaded Presley to sign up as a soldier. Presley had wanted to join Special Services, allowing him the opportunity to perform while at the same time getting an easier ride than other soldiers. Parker, on the other hand, was fully aware that any special treatment given to Presley would instantly be used against him in the media and by those who disliked his style of music. If Presley could show the world that he was treated the same as any other young man, Parker told him, then more people would accept him and his music. Parker was also afraid that any attempt to block Presley from being drafted would result in a more detailed look into Parker's own service record. Parker also realized that it would be a great opportunity to promote Presley by having the media witness his induction day, including the Army haircut that would see the shearing of Presley's iconic hair style.

While Presley was serving in West Germany, Parker was hard at work keeping Presley's name known to the public. He realized that by keeping RCA Victor, and more importantly the public, hungry for more Presley material, he would be able to negotiate a better contract when Presley returned from active service. He had arranged for Presley to record five singles before his induction, guaranteeing RCA Victor enough material to release over a two-year period. RCA was eager for Presley to record in West Germany, but Parker insisted that it would ruin his reputation as a regular soldier if he was able to go into a recording studio. Stories appeared in the press regularly about Presley, including that he would do a live CCTV broadcast when he returned and that he had signed a deal for a series of annual television spectaculars to be broadcast across the country. All of these stories were fabrications, but it kept his name in view of the public.

Parker appeared to be in complete control during Presley's time away, but he was worried about the outside influence that Presley might encounter in West Germany. Parker had declined to travel to Europe, denying that he spoke any language other than English. He sent Presley's friends to keep him company, arranged for business associates to watch over him while they were working in Europe, and kept in regular contact with him. He was reportedly afraid that Presley would realize that there were other managers available prepared to sign contracts that did not require as much as 25% of his earnings. Parker was still worried that Presley would return to nothing, that the public would have found a new star to fawn over by then, and that his golden goose would be reduced to nothing more than a "has-been".

Elvis returns (1960–1965) 
For Presley's return in March 1960, Parker had arranged for a train to take him from Washington, D.C., to Memphis, with stops along the way for fans to see their idol in person. If Parker had had any doubts about his return, they were soon gone when he witnessed the turnout along the route.

Frank Sinatra, who had declared Presley a rock and roll disgrace in the 1950s, was keen to have him appear on his show. Parker, not one to forget harsh criticism, stated that the fee would be  for two songs, a total of eight minutes on screen; Sinatra himself was receiving a lower sum for the whole show, but he agreed. The show, titled "Welcome Home, Elvis", was Presley's first national television appearance since The Ed Sullivan Show in January 1957.

After the Sinatra special, Parker decided that Presley's future lay in Hollywood. He envisioned him as an entertainment machine, pumping out three films and soundtracks a year, until the end of the decade. He allowed him to perform three live shows in 1961, all charity events, two in Memphis and one in Hawaii. After that, until 1968, Presley gave no live performances, and had very little contact with his fans. Parker signed long-term contracts with the film studios, possibly to guarantee work and income for both him and Presley. This was, with hindsight, a mistake on his part; if he had negotiated each deal separately based on the profits of the previous film, he could have received more money. Throughout the 1960s Parker would continually renegotiate Presley's film contracts, often paying little attention to the scripts or the concerns of his client. These deals were sometimes so harsh on the studios that it led producer Hal Wallis to state: "I'd rather try and close a deal with the Devil."

Presley had to do no more than provide RCA Victor with three albums a year, and his film soundtracks did that for him. With no touring or public appearances to be made, Parker was able to keep costs to a minimum. For the first few years Presley's films were somewhat successful, his albums topped the charts, and any singles that were released were mostly hits. But as time went on, as the Beatles began their dominance of the music charts and the worldwide phenomenon known as Beatlemania began, Presley became less significant. His films still made money and his albums still sold well, but the profits were falling. This led Parker to insist that films be made cheaply, on a strict schedule, and with as little hassle as possible.

Dead ends (1966–1967) 
For the remainder of the 1960s, Presley made films that relied heavily on exotic locations and mundane songs, and he was tied into contracts that he could not escape. Parker did not appear to care if the films were good or bad but only about the profits. When Presley complained to him that he wanted better scripts, Parker reminded him of his lavish lifestyle and that risking $1 million a year for doing practically no work was dangerous. Presley's career stagnated while artists like the Beatles, the Rolling Stones, and The Beach Boys dominated the charts. Later, in 1983, Parker admitted during an interview that after 1966, the income from Presley films and soundtracks was dramatically reduced.

To make up for lack of earnings, Parker arranged for Presley's gold Cadillac to go on tour. Selling it to RCA for $24,000 ($ in  dollars), it was used to promote Presley's latest film, Frankie & Johnny. The Cadillac tour proved to be somewhat more successful than the film itself. In Houston alone in one afternoon, 40,000 people paid to see it, with one woman offering to have sex with the tour manager if he would allow her to sit in it.

On January 2, 1967, Parker re-negotiated his managerial/agent contract with Presley, persuading him to increase Parker's share from 25% to 50% on certain transactions. When critics questioned this arrangement and that Parker was exploiting Presley for more money because of greed, Presley quipped "I could have signed with East Coast Entertainment where they take 70 percent!" Parker used the argument that Presley was his only client and he was thus earning only one fee.

After Presley showed signs of rebellion again in 1966 and because of his flagging career, Parker decided that it was time for a new approach: marriage. Frank Sinatra had married Mia Farrow in 1966, and it had provided Sinatra enough publicity for Parker to sit up and take notice. Presley had been living with Priscilla Beaulieu, ten years his junior, for the past four years, but it had not been public knowledge.

Parker hoped that marriage would not only boost Presley's career but also possibly tame him. With Priscilla's father dropping heavy hints, and fear that their relationship might become public beforehand, Parker persuaded Presley that he should make an "honest woman" of her in the very near future. However, it would be a quiet wedding. Parker decided that Las Vegas was the perfect place to do it, and on May 1, 1967, the couple were married in a ceremony that lasted only eight minutes and had a handful of guests. A breakfast reception was arranged, taking place after the media got their photographs of the couple.

Live performance comeback (1968–1972) 

It took the energetic 1968 television special Elvis, which the Singer Company sponsored, and a subsequent series of acclaimed recording sessions in Memphis, Tennessee, that included songs such as "Suspicious Minds" and "In the Ghetto", to restore Presley's musical reputation. However, the music scene had radically changed. It was producer Steve Binder who put forward the idea of Presley singing his old hits and even the staged section with his old band, Scotty Moore and D. J. Fontana, the latter inspired by a post-rehearsal informal jam in Presley's dressing room. Presley was never one to stand up against Parker, but he knew that this TV show was his one chance at a true comeback, and with Binder backing him, Presley told Parker he was doing it "Binder's way". Their instincts were proven right; the TV special proved an enormous hit, and the album that was released featuring performances from the special became a best-seller, but the comeback special was interrupted when Robert F. Kennedy was assassinated on June 5, 1968. After the special, Parker managed Presley's return to live performance, including a set of brief U.S. tours and many engagements in Las Vegas. Following the success of Presley's Las Vegas return, Parker signed a contract with the International Hotel to guarantee Presley would play a month-long engagement for $125,000 a week ($ in  dollars), an unheard-of sum at the time. During this part of Presley's career, Parker and Presley agreed to a 50/50 "partnership", which, with Parker controlling merchandising and other non-music related items, resulted in Parker earning more than his client.

After the success of Presley's return to live performing in Las Vegas, Parker decided it was time to take him back out on tour for the first time in 13 years. The tours were so popular and financially successful that they determined Presley's workload for the remainder of his life and career. Parker's main role during these tours was to plan the logistics and make sure tickets were sold. He would usually fly ahead to the venues and prepare the way for Presley's entourage to follow so that he and Presley rarely saw each other, and, as time progressed, it became even more difficult for Parker to get in contact with Presley. These live performances, as well as being financially satisfying, also allowed Parker to fulfill Presley's recording contract with RCA Victor. Between 1969 and 1972 alone, RCA released three albums of live material.

By 1972, Parker had managed to increase Presley's weekly wage in Las Vegas to $150,000 ($ in  dollars), and secured $50,000 a year ($ in  dollars) for himself as a "consultant to the hotel chain". Parker had also decided that it was time for Presley to return to New York, and had arranged for him to perform at Madison Square Garden in June. Originally planned as three performances, demand was so high that Parker decided to add a fourth performance, making Presley the first performer to sell out the venue four consecutive times. These four shows alone grossed $730,000 ($ in  dollars).

On July 8, 1972, inspired by the visit of President Richard Nixon to China a few months earlier, Parker announced that there would be a worldwide satellite broadcast from Hawaii to allow the whole world the chance to see a Presley concert, "since it is impossible for us to play in every major city". (During Presley's career, except for a few concerts in Canada in 1957, he never performed outside the United States.) Parker held another press conference on September 4, 1972, in Las Vegas to confirm that the concert, now titled Aloha from Hawaii, would be broadcast on January 14, 1973. The press were told that an audience of one billion was expected to tune in to see the "first entertainment special to be broadcast live around the world", although Parker had not taken into account the fact that many countries, including parts of Europe and America, would not see the concert live due to the time of the broadcast. Two weeks after the Las Vegas press conference Parker received a letter from Honolulu Advertiser columnist Eddie Sherman. Sherman had read in news accounts that there was to be no charge for admittance to the concerts, a donation to charity being required instead. He suggested to Parker that, as Presley had recorded and was still performing the song "I'll Remember You" written by Kui Lee, the donations could go to the Kui Lee Cancer Fund that had been set up following the death of the songwriter in 1966. Seeing the chance to publicize Presley's charitable nature once again, Parker eagerly agreed. The album was released simultaneously around the world, and went to number 1 on the US charts, the first Presley album to do so since the Roustabout soundtrack, in 1964.

1973–1974 
Aloha from Hawaii proved to be the last great moment in Presley's career. In May 1973, in an attempt to deal with Presley's growing dependence on prescription drugs, Presley's father, Vernon, and Parker attempted to cut off his supply. They hired private detectives to find out where the drugs were coming from and were successful in stopping any more from reaching Presley. However, it wasn't long before Presley was able to find other doctors to meet his demands. In later years, several of Presley's inner circle would tell of how difficult it was to persuade Presley to quit the drugs. As well as being their employer and paying their wages, he was also their main source of access to drugs for themselves. Presley's main doctor, George C. Nichopoulos, would often replace Presley's medication with placebos in an attempt to wean him off the drugs. This would be successful for a short time, but when Presley discovered the trick, he simply found himself other doctors. Author Alanna Nash suggests that one of the reasons Parker didn't do more is because he may have just not known how to handle the situation. In her book, The Colonel, she writes: "in the days before the Betty Ford Clinic, the Colonel didn't know where to take him for discreet, effective help and loathed risking the loss of work if the truth got out".

After the Aloha special, Parker made a deal that would later be used in court to prove that he had not acted in the best interests of Presley. He offered RCA Records the opportunity to buy Presley's entire back catalog for $5.4 million. At the time, Presley's back catalog was not considered very important and RCA initially calculated it at being worth much less, but in later years it would become one of the most valuable record catalogs in the music business. The sale of the back catalog to RCA meant that after his death, Presley's estate would not receive any royalties for any Presley recordings made prior to 1973. However, Presley had asked him to raise funds to pay for his upcoming divorce settlement, and Priscilla divorced Elvis in 1973.

During a closing night performance on September 3, 1973, following news that a Hilton staff member whom Presley was fond of had been fired, Presley attacked Hilton Hotels chairman Barron Hilton in a verbal rage on stage. Parker was furious, and he stormed into Presley's dressing room after the show to confront him. After a heated argument between the two, Presley told Parker he was fired. Angered by this outburst, Parker declared: "You can't fire me. I quit!"

Parker accepted that their working relationship was over, Parker telling them over the phone that Dr. Nick's services are no longer required, and demanded that Presley pay him $2 million to end their contract; money Parker claimed he was owed. After nearly two weeks of trading insults back and forth, Parker and Presley decided to continue to work together.

Although many around Presley were worried about his worsening drug dependency, Parker appeared to ignore the problem. Several members of Presley's band later stated that Parker had no idea just how bad the situation was getting. However, other friends and members of Presley's entourage have stood by the suggestion that Parker didn't want to admit there was such a problem because he didn't know how to deal with it, and he was also worried about any negative publicity it would create. According to Parker himself, he did privately attempt to talk to his client a number of times about the matter, but allegedly every time Parker casually told Presley to quit or at least tone it down with the pill popping and binge eating, Presley would respond by telling Parker to stay out of his personal business.

From 1974 onward, Presley's weight gain and prescription drug abuse became too much to be controlled. In Las Vegas, he was starting to appear drugged on stage, slurring his words and forgetting song lyrics.

1975–1977 
In February 1975, during his engagement in Las Vegas, Presley, along with Parker, met with Barbra Streisand and Jon Peters. They discussed the possibility of Presley's co-starring with Streisand in a remake of the film A Star Is Born. Seeing it as a chance to finally be taken seriously as an actor, Presley agreed to take the role if the contracts could be worked out. According to Presley's friend, Jerry Schilling, Presley was excited about the opportunity to take on a new challenge. Streisand's production company, First Artists, offered Presley a salary of $500,000 ($ in  dollars) and 10% of the profits. Parker, who had always dealt with Presley's film contracts and viewed the offer as a starting bid to earning more money, instead asked for a salary $1 million ($ in  dollars), 50% of the profits, plus another $100,000 ($ in  dollars) for expenses, and spoke of needing to arrange details of a soundtrack deal. First Artists, not used to such huge demands, didn't put forward a counter-offer and decided instead to offer the role, along with the original salary offer, to Kris Kristofferson, who accepted. Parker later claimed that Presley had asked him to make the contract so demanding so that they would not offer him the part, although many of Presley's friends have contradicted Parker's statement because they had said Presley was furious at losing the role.

Later in 1975, the government of Saudi Arabia offered Parker $5 million for Presley to perform there. Parker turned the offer down, and Presley was overjoyed when they replied with another offer of $10 million. Yet, despite Presley's eagerness to do the shows, Parker again turned them down. Promoters in South America also made offers, as much as $2.5 million, and all of them were turned down by Parker; "Well, whenever I need $2.5 million I'll call you," he once said to them. Presley was beginning to consider new management, with Concerts West co-founder Tom Hulett being the clear favorite for the job. Hulett's company had managed tours for Presley, and he had worked with artists such as Led Zeppelin. According to several people who knew Presley at the time, the talks with Hulett got so far along that it seemed almost inevitable the deal would be done. The talks had included details about European tours, and buying out Presley's contract would not have been a problem for Hulett and his company. Despite this, however, the deal never materialized. According to Presley's biographer Peter Guralnick, Presley and Parker "were really like, in a sense, a married couple, who started out with great love, loyalty, respect that lasted for a considerable period of time, and went through a number of stages until, towards the end of Presley's life, they should have walked away. None of the rules of the relationship was operative any longer, yet neither had the courage to walk away, for a variety of reasons." In any case, Parker remained Presley's manager without a break until Presley's death in 1977.

By this time, Parker was aware that Presley needed a rest from touring and the chance to deal with his prescription drug addictions. He phoned Presley's father once to suggest taking time off, but Vernon Presley told him they couldn't afford to stop touring due to Presley's constant and lavish spending of money. Vernon also threatened to find a new manager if Parker wouldn't continue to tour Presley.

In July 1976, three of Presley's personal bodyguards and members of the "Memphis Mafia", Robert Gene "Red" West, his cousin Sonny West and David Hebler, were fired by Vernon Presley and decided to write a tell-all book about their life in his inner circle, Elvis: What Happened? Worried about the impact such details might have on his career, Presley, through his father, asked Parker to stop the publication. Parker made several attempts to have it stopped, but failed to do so. According to Presley's friend, Larry Geller, Parker secretly wanted the book to be published, hoping that it would help Presley realize the severity of his situation and persuade him to do something about it. The book was published one year later on July 12, 1977, one month before Presley's death.

For the remainder of Presley's life, Parker saw little of him. The two had become almost strangers, and false reports in the media suggested that Presley's contract was up for sale. Although Parker publicly denied these claims, he had been in talks with Peter Grant, the manager of Led Zeppelin, about the possibility of him overseeing a European tour for Presley. As with all the talk about Presley touring overseas, Parker never followed through with the deal.

1977: Presley's death 
When Presley died on August 16, 1977, one day before he was due to go out on tour, some accounts suggest Parker acted as if nothing had happened. Other accounts suggest he slumped in his chair at his office, muttered, "Oh, dear God", and then quickly phoned Vernon Presley, where Parker advised Presley's father that his son's image needed to be protected.

Parker set out to protect his future income. Asked by a journalist what he would do now, Parker responded: "Why, I'll just go right on managing him!" Almost immediately, before even visiting Graceland, Parker traveled to New York City to meet with merchandising associates and executives with RCA Records, instructing them to prepare for a huge demand in Presley products. Shortly afterward, he traveled to Memphis for Presley's funeral. Mourners recall being surprised at his wearing a Hawaiian shirt and baseball cap, smoking his trademark cigar, and purposely avoiding the casket. At the funeral, he persuaded Presley's father to sign over control of Presley's career in death to him.

In September 1978, shortly after the first anniversary of Presley's death, Parker arranged a fan festival, Always Elvis, where he, Vernon, and Presley's ex-wife Priscilla, dedicated a bronze statue of him in the lobby of the Las Vegas Hilton.

1978–1997: After Elvis 
Following Presley's death, Parker set up a licensing operation with Factors Etc. Inc, to control Presley merchandise and keep a steady income supporting his estate. It was later revealed that Presley owned 22% of the company, Parker owned 56%, and the final 22% was made up of various business associates. Due to an ill-advised agreement between Parker and Presley that gave RCA sole ownership of all his recording royalties prior to 1973, the estate was relying heavily on the income from Factors Etc. Inc. However, because Parker was still entitled to 50% of all Presley's income, and after taxes were taken off, the overall amount going towards the upkeep of the estate was less than $1 million a year.

In January 1979, it was discovered that Presley had lost out on royalties for songs on which he had been listed as an author or composer because Parker had unwisely advised him not to sign up to ASCAP or its younger competitor, BMI. Experts in the field at the time estimated that it had potentially cost Presley millions of dollars and worse for Parker, it had also potentially cost him those millions of dollars. Parker had unknowingly backed himself into a financial corner.

By 1980, the cost of running the estate was estimated to be as much as $500,000 a year. Priscilla and the Trust were prepared to let Parker continue to handle Presley's business affairs, and petitioned the court to that end. However, Judge Joseph Evans, aware that Lisa Marie Presley was still a minor, appointed attorney Blanchard E. Tual to investigate Parker's management. Tual, once appointed as Lisa Marie's guardian ad litem, chose to investigate the entire period of Parker's management of Presley; his preliminary finding was that Parker's management deal of 50% was extortionate compared to the industry average of 15–20%. He also noted that Parker's handling of Presley's business affairs during his lifetime, including the decision to sell off past royalties to RCA for $5.4 million in 1973, was unethical and poorly handled. During a second, more detailed investigation, Tual discovered that all earnings were paid directly to the Trust instead of Parker. By this time, with the IRS demanding almost $15 million in taxes, the estate was facing bankruptcy.

On August 14, 1981, Judge Evans ordered Elvis Presley Enterprises to sue Parker for mismanagement. Parker countersued. The case against Parker was settled out of court in 1983, with the estate paying him $2 million ($ in  dollars) in exchange for all Presley audio recordings or visual images that he owned and the termination of his involvement in any Presley related earnings for five years.

Parker had worked as a "consultant" for Hilton Hotels since Presley's death, with some believing he was working to pay off debts owed to the casino from his gambling during Presley's performances there. Part of this role resulted in Parker keeping the same fourth-floor suite he occupied when Presley was alive. By 1984, with his gambling debts reportedly rising again, he was evicted. On the surface, however, relations between the two were as good as ever, with Parker helping the Hilton to commemorate the tenth anniversary of Presley's death.

The disputes with the Presley estate did not terminate Parker's association with Presley. Parker appeared at posthumous events honoring Presley, such as the 1993 issuing of a U.S. postage stamp with Presley's likeness. He also became friendly with the estate again, attending special ceremonies and events in Memphis, invited by Priscilla. However, he did occasionally bother them by criticizing some decisions. In 1994, following the marriage of Lisa Marie and  Michael Jackson, Parker stated that Presley would not have approved. In 1993, interest in Presley's enduring legend, interest that is sometimes notable for its obsessiveness, provoked Parker to remark: "I don't think I exploited Elvis as much as he's being exploited today."

Personal life

As Presley's fame grew, people became interested in Parker as well. For a time, Parker lied about his childhood, claiming to have been born in Huntington, West Virginia, in the early 1900s to explain his Dutch accent as being a Southern accent, and to have run away from home at an early age to join a circus owned by an uncle before serving in the U.S. Army prior to his involvement with being a music manager. The truth about his early years was revealed in 1960 when one of Parker's sisters, Nel Dankers-van Kuijk, living in the Netherlands, recognized him in photographs standing next to Presley.

One of Parker's brothers, Adam "Ad" van Kuijk, visited Parker once in Los Angeles in April 1961. Parker privately acknowledged his brother and even introduced him to Presley. During the week-long visit, Parker was informed by Adam van Kuijk that their mother had died three years earlier in 1958, never knowing what happened to her son after he left the Netherlands for good in 1929. Adam van Kuijk died from emphysema in 1992, never seeing or visiting Parker again.

The claim of Parker's Dutch heritage was publicly confirmed when Parker unsuccessfully tried to avert a lawsuit brought against him in 1982 by asserting in open court that he was a Dutch citizen. The opposing counsel responded by presenting into evidence a copy of Parker's U.S. Army enlistment form which stated, through a legal loophole, that because Parker signed his enlistment papers under his alias "Thomas Andrew Parker" and once he took the oath by swearing allegiance to the United States of America, he unofficially renounced his Dutch citizenship, although it is claimed that he died a Dutch citizen. In 1993, in one of his last media appearances, Parker appeared in a television interview with Dutch TV director Jorrit van der Kooi where they spoke to each other in Dutch about the Netherlands and about Elvis Presley's life and career. During the interview, Parker said that he was not aware that another one of his sisters, Adriana van Kuijk, had died in the Netherlands a few years before.

Marriage
In 1935, while travelling with a circus, Parker met and married 27-year-old Marie Francis Mott. Marie was one of six children, had been married twice before, and had a son from her first marriage. Unbeknown to Parker at the time, she had a second son from her first marriage, but had given him up for adoption at birth due to his disability (a club foot). Some suggested that Parker married Marie to disguise his illegal status in the United States; a marriage to a U.S. citizen with a child could help him bury his past in a "ready-made family". However, there is no definite proof that anything other than romance led to their marriage.

Others, however, had doubts about whether they were legally married at all. According to interviews given by Parker to the Associated Press many years later, he and Marie were married in Tampa, Florida, during the winter of 1932, but the Florida Office of Vital Statistics had no record of such a marriage any time between 1927 and 1946. It is also recorded that Marie did not divorce her second husband until 1936, and her brother, Bitsy, recalled no ceremony of marriage between Parker and Marie. Author Alanna Nash has suggested that the couple may have simply placed their hands on a Bible and given themselves a "carny wedding".

In the early days of their marriage, Marie and Parker worked together in the carnivals. As Parker's management career began to take off, Marie became more of a housewife, although she would occasionally travel with him to various parts of the country. During the 1960s, after many years of ill health, Marie began to display signs of dementia. Parker began to distance himself emotionally from her, heartbroken by her slow mental deterioration from the woman he once knew. Marie died on November 25, 1986, of a chronic brain syndrome at age 78. In October 1990, Parker married Loanne Miller, his secretary since 1972. From then on, he continued living in Las Vegas, mostly avoiding contact with the press.

Gambling
Many Parker biographers, including Dirk Vellenga and Alanna Nash, have stated that Parker's gambling habit began to get out of control in the mid-1960s. During the 1960s, with his wife's health deteriorating, and Presley's career struggling, Parker found an escape with gambling at Las Vegas casinos. Fans and biographers alike believe that one of the main reasons Parker signed Presley to a Vegas hotel in 1969 for his live comeback was to help cover losses he experienced in their casino. He would often spend 12–14 hours at a time gambling in the casinos, betting large sums. It is believed that Parker lost at least $1 million a year from gambling. At the time of Presley's death in 1977, it was suspected that Parker owed the Las Vegas Hilton over $30 million ($ in  dollars) in gambling losses. After a lifetime that saw him earn in excess of $100 million, Parker's estate was worth barely $1 million when he died.

"Colonel Tom Parker rubbed my head in Vegas", Eddie Murphy stated in 1989. "A couple times he set me up in the Elvis Presley suite on top of the Hilton, and I would go play Elvis for a week… One night we were at the crap table together and he rubbed my head for luck. I wanted to punch him in the face. But this guy is like eighty years old – too old to be taught the limits of racism… He probably doesn't realize how horrible a thing that was to do."

Songwriter Mac Davis recounted a similar experience where Parker rubbed his head and declared "You're going to be a star. You tell everybody the Colonel touched your head." Later, Davis says "He remembered me, and he said 'I told you you were going to be a star.' I said, 'Yeah, you rubbed my head.' He said 'Did I really?' I said 'Yeah'. He said 'Well then there ain't no doubt about it. You're going to be a star.'"

Death
Parker made his last public appearances in 1994. By this point, he was so stricken with diabetes, gout, and other health problems such that he could barely leave his own house. 

On January 20, 1997, Parker's wife heard a crashing sound from the living room, and when she heard no response to her calls, she went in to find him slumped over in his chair after suffering a stroke. He died of complications from the stroke the following morning at a hospital in Las Vegas, Nevada, at age 87. His death certificate lists his birth name as Andreas Cornelis van Kuijk, his country of birth as the Netherlands, and his citizenship as American. 

His funeral was held at the Hilton Hotel and was attended by a handful of friends and former associates, including Eddy Arnold and Sam Phillips. Priscilla Presley attended the funeral to represent the Elvis Presley Estate and gave a eulogy that, to many in the room, summed up Parker: "Elvis and the Colonel made history together, and the world is richer, better and far more interesting because of their collaboration. And now I need to locate my wallet, because I noticed there was no ticket booth on the way in here, but I'm sure that the Colonel must have arranged for some toll on the way out." She reiterated her positive opinion to Tom Hanks in 2022 when the actor prepared to play Parker for Elvis (2022). Hanks said, "I was anticipating hearing horror stories about this venal, cheap crook. Just the opposite. Both Priscilla and Jerry said he was a lovely man". According to Priscilla, Elvis was happy to pay 50% to Parker to manage him.

Portrayals and popular culture

Film
Parker was portrayed by:
 Pat Hingle in Elvis (1979), the original made-for-television film, produced by Dick Clark, directed by John Carpenter, and starring Kurt Russell.
 Hugh Gillin in the TV film Elvis and Me (1988).
 Beau Bridges in the TV film Elvis and the Colonel: The Untold Story (1993), alongside Rob Youngblood.
 Randy Quaid in the CBS miniseries Elvis (2005), alongside Jonathan Rhys Meyers as Elvis Presley. Quaid was nominated for a Golden Globe, Emmy Award and a Satellite Award win for Best Supporting Actor in a Miniseries or Movie.
 John Carroll Lynch in the film Shangri-La Suite (2016)
 Billy Gardell in the CMT TV series Sun Records (2017). In this series Parker's connections with former clients Eddy Arnold and Hank Snow are also represented along with his management of Presley.
 Tom Hanks in Elvis, the 2022 film about Presley, directed by Baz Luhrmann.

Literature
 Vivek Tiwary's The Fifth Beatle (2013), a graphic novel biography of the Beatles manager Brian Epstein by writer Vivek Tiwary, depicts a meeting between Parker and Epstein that took place in the mid-1960s. In the scene, Parker is satirically portrayed as a gluttonous, satanic figure. The scene contrasts Parker's management of Elvis with the freedom Epstein allows the Beatles. The scene also portrays Parker as anti-semitic. Tiwary claimed in an interview that Parker did make those comments.

Television
 In the TV Show Vinyl, Richie Finestra (portrayed by Bobby Cannavale), president of record label American Century, meets Elvis Presley (portrayed by Shawn Klush) in 1973, in Las Vegas. Richie attempts to convince Elvis to stop singing in Las Vegas and instead focus on making new, creative music, acting like a true king. The Colonel (portrayed by Gene Jones) gets furious when he finds out Richie was going behind his back and talking about papers with Elvis and has Elvis point a gun at him.

References

Sources

Further reading

External links
 
 Interview with Loanne Parker
 Tom Parker collection and interviews with co workers 
 ED Bonja Interview Elvis Photographer - the Elvis Information Network exclusive – Interview with En Bonja, who worked directly for the Colonel as Elvis's official photographer and tour manager
 Colonel Tom Parker's home (former), 409 Park Ridge Avenue, Temple Terrace, Fl.

1909 births
1997 deaths
Dutch music managers
Dutch emigrants to the United States
United States Army soldiers
Impresarios
People from Breda
20th-century Dutch musicians
Dutch gamblers
People from Temple Terrace, Florida
Military personnel from Florida